Laga Xafo Laga Dadhi  is a city adjacent to Addis Ababa located in the Oromia Special Zone Surrounding Finfinne. It was created in 2008 from North Shewa Zone (Oromia)

See also 

 Districts in the Oromia Region

References 

Populated places in the Oromia Region